UCW may refer to:
 UCW: Understanding Children's Work, a joint ILO, UNICEF, World Bank programme
 Union Carriage & Wagon, a rolling stock manufacturer in South Africa
 Union of Communication Workers
 Unit Control Word, a construct in the channels of IBM mainframes
 University of Worcester, formerly University College Worcester
 Aberystwyth University, now University College of Wales
 University Canada West
 United Campus Workers, an affiliate of the Communications Workers of America organizing higher education workers in the state of Tennessee.